Ecclesia in Medio Oriente (The Church in the Middle East) is the fourth and last post-synodal apostolic exhortation issued by Pope Benedict XVI. It was signed on 14 September 2012 in Beirut, Lebanon.

References

External links 

 

Apostolic exhortations
Documents of Pope Benedict XVI
Catholic theology and doctrine
Christianity in the Middle East
2012 documents